1896 in sports describes the year's events in world sport.

Athletics
USA Outdoor Track and Field Championships
 March 22 - Greek runner Charilaos Vasilakos wins the first modern marathon (3:18)

American football
College championship
 College football national championship – Princeton Tigers

Professional championships
 Western Pennsylvania champions – Allegheny Athletic Association

Association football
England
 The Football League – Aston Villa 45 points, Derby County 41, Everton 39, Bolton Wanderers 37, Sunderland 37, Stoke FC 30
 FA Cup final – The Wednesday 2–1 Wolverhampton Wanderers at Crystal Palace, London.
Scotland
 Scottish Football League – Celtic
 Scottish Cup final – Hearts 3–1 Hibernian at Logie Green

Baseball
National championship
 Baltimore Orioles win the third of three successive National League championships 
Events
 Temple Cup – Baltimore Orioles 4–0 Cleveland Spiders

Boxing
 10 March - After Bob Fitzsimmons KOs much larger Jim Corbett to win world HW championship he says, The bigger they are, the harder they fall
Lineal world champions
 World Heavyweight Championship – James J. Corbett
 World Middleweight Championship – title vacant
 World Welterweight Championship – Tommy Ryan
 World Lightweight Championship – vacant → George "Kid" Lavigne
 World Featherweight Championship – George Dixon
 World Bantamweight Championship – Jimmy Barry

Cricket
Events
 England retain The Ashes, defeating Australia 2–1 in a three-match series.  In a low-scoring decider at The Oval, England win by 66 runs.
England
 County Championship – Yorkshire
 Minor Counties Championship – Worcestershire
 Most runs – K S Ranjitsinhji 2780 @ 57.91 (HS 171*)
 Most wickets – J T Hearne 257 @ 14.28 (BB 9–73)
 Wisden Five Cricketers of the Season – Syd Gregory, Dick Lilley, K S Ranjitsinhji, Tom Richardson, Hugh Trumble
Australia
 Sheffield Shield – New South Wales
 Most runs – Harry Donnan 626 @ 69.55 (HS 160)
 Most wickets – Tom McKibbin 46 @ 23.86 (BB 8–93)
India
 Bombay Presidency – Europeans shared with Parsees
South Africa
 Currie Cup – not contested
West Indies
 Inter-Colonial Tournament – not contested

Figure skating
Events
 Inaugural World Figure Skating Championships (open to men only) is held in Saint Petersburg
World Figure Skating Championships
 World Men's Champion – Gilbert Fuchs (Germany)

Golf
Major tournaments
 British Open – Harry Vardon (the first of Vardon's six British Open titles)
 U.S. Open – James Foulis
Other tournaments
 British Amateur – Freddie Tait
 US Amateur – H. J. Whigham

Horse racing
England
 Grand National – The Soarer
 1,000 Guineas Stakes – Thais
 2,000 Guineas Stakes – St. Frusquin
 The Derby – Persimmon
 The Oaks – Canterbury Pilgrim
 St. Leger Stakes – Persimmon
Australia
 Melbourne Cup – Newhaven
Canada
 Queen's Plate – Millbrook
Ireland
 Irish Grand National – Royston Crow
 Irish Derby Stakes – Gulsalberk
USA
 Kentucky Derby – Lieut. Gibson
 Preakness Stakes – Margrave
 Belmont Stakes – Hastings

Ice hockey

 14 February — the Winnipeg Victorias defeat the Montreal Victorias 2–0 in a challenge match to win the 1896 Stanley Cup championship
 7 March — the Montreal Victorias are the 1896 AHAC season champions.
 March — Queen's University defeats Stratford, Ontario 12–3 to win the Ontario Hockey Association (OHA) title. The club does not challenge Winnipeg.
 17 November — the Western Pennsylvania Hockey League, which later became the first ice hockey league to openly trade and hire players, began play at Pittsburgh's Schenley Park Casino.
 17 December — the Schenley Park Casino, which was the first multi-purpose arena with the technology to create an artificial ice surface in North America as well as the home to the Western Pennsylvania Hockey League, was destroyed in a fire.
 30 December — the Montreal Victorias defeat the Winnipeg Victorias 6–5 in a challenge match to regain the Stanley Cup

Motor racing
Paris-Marseille-Paris Trail
 The 1896 Paris–Marseille–Paris Trail is held over 1710 km from 24 September to 3 October and won by Émile Mayade driving a Panhard-Levassor 8 hp model in a time of 67:42:58.  The race is in retrospect sometimes referred to as the II Grand Prix de l'ACF.

Olympic Games
1896 Summer Olympics
 The 1896 Summer Olympics, the first modern Games, takes place in Athens with 13 nations competing, the most competitors coming from Greece, Germany and France.
 16 April — American James Connolly wins the triple jump to become the first Olympic champion in over 1,500 years.
 Winners receive a silver medal and a crown of olive branches; Greece wins the most medals (46) and the United States wins the most gold medals (11).

Rowing
The Boat Race
 28 March — Oxford wins the 53rd Oxford and Cambridge Boat Race
 There is no Harvard–Yale Regatta during "a breakdown in relations between the two schools". From the third Race in 1859, the only exceptions outside major wars are 1871 and 1896.

Rugby league
Events
 In the 1895–96 Northern Rugby Football Union season's final match, Manningham defeats Halifax to claim the inaugural Rugby Football League Championship.
 The inaugural Rugby League Challenge Cup competition begins in the 1896–97 season.

England
 Championship – Manningham
 Lancashire League Championship – Runcorn
 Yorkshire League Championship – Manningham

Rugby union
Home Nations Championship
 14th Home Nations Championship series is won by Ireland

Skiing
 The foundation of the Ski-Club of Grenoble by Henry Duhamel.

Speed skating
Speed Skating World Championships
 Men's All-round Champion – Jaap Eden (Netherlands)

Tennis
England
 Wimbledon Men's Singles Championship – Harold Mahony (Ireland) defeats Wilfred Baddeley (GB) 6–2 6–8 5–7 8–6 6–3
 Wimbledon Women's Singles Championship – Charlotte Cooper Sterry (GB) defeats Alice Simpson-Pickering (GB) 6–2 6–3
France
 French Men's Singles Championship – André Vacherot (France) defeats Gérard Brosselin (France) 6–1 7–5
USA
 American Men's Singles Championship – Robert Wrenn (USA) defeats Fred Hovey (USA) 7–5 3–6 6–0 1–6 6–1
 American Women's Singles Championship – Elisabeth Moore (USA) defeats Juliette Atkinson (USA) 6–4 4–6 6–2 6–2

References

 
Sports by year